Deborah Marak is an Indian National Congress activist and member of Meghalaya Legislative Assembly from Williamnagar constituency. She won the seat in 2013 assembly elections and contested the same seat for the 2018 Meghalaya assembly elections. She was a cabinet minister in the second Mukul Sangma ministry.

References

External links
Deborah Marak affidavit

Living people
Year of birth missing (living people)
Indian National Congress politicians from Meghalaya
Meghalaya MLAs 2013–2018